The Long Teng Cup was an annual international friendly football tournament organized by the Chinese Taipei Football Association and held in Kaohsiung, Taiwan. The competition has been contested by Chinese Taipei, Hong Kong, Macau and Philippines. Hong Kong has won the first two editions of the tournament.

Tournament winners

Top goalscorers

See also
 List of sporting events in Taiwan

References

 
International association football competitions in Asia
International association football competitions hosted by Taiwan
Recurring sporting events established in 2010
Recurring sporting events disestablished in 2011
2010 establishments in Taiwan
2011 disestablishments in Taiwan